Boom Bang-a-Bang: 50 Years of Eurovision is a one-hour documentary that aired on BBC One on 16 May 2006. The programme celebrates 50 years of the Eurovision Song Contest. The programme was presented and narrated by long-serving Eurovision commentator, Terry Wogan.

It included a guest appearance from the UK representative for the 2006 Eurovision Song Contest Daz Sampson, as well as archive footage from previous UK and other entries from previous song contests.

See also
Congratulations: 50 Years of the Eurovision Song Contest

References

External links

Television shows about the Eurovision Song Contest
Nostalgia television shows
United Kingdom in the Eurovision Song Contest
Documentary television series about music
2006 in British television
Golden jubilees
BBC television documentaries about history during the 21st Century
BBC television documentaries about history during the 20th Century